Sanicula laciniata is a flowering plant species of in the family Apiaceae. Common names include coastal blacksnakeroot, laceleaf sanicle, and coast sanicle.

Distribution and ecology
The species is distributed along the Central and North Coast Ranges of California, extending into southern Oregon. A typical occurrence is on Ring Mountain in Marin County, California, where it occurs in association with the poison sanicle, Pacific sanicle and numerous other forbs.

References

External links
 Sanicula at the PLANTS database.
  Calflora Database: Sanicula laciniata (Coast sanicle,  Coastal blacksnakeroot)
 Plants Profile for Sanicula laciniata (coastal blacksnakeroot)
 U.C. Photos gallery of  Sanicula laciniata

laciniata
Flora of California
Flora of Oregon
Flora of the Klamath Mountains
Natural history of the California chaparral and woodlands
Natural history of the California Coast Ranges
Flora without expected TNC conservation status